UFC Fight Night: Yan vs. Dvalishvili (also known as UFC Fight Night 221, UFC on ESPN+ 79) was a mixed martial arts event produced by the Ultimate Fighting Championship that took place on March 11, 2023, at The Theater at Virgin Hotels in Paradise, Nevada part of the Las Vegas Metropolitan Area, United States.

Background
The venue was originally known as The Joint (part of the Hard Rock Hotel and Casino) and held several UFC events in the early 2000s. This event marked the promotion's first visit to the venue after it was rebranded and the first since The Ultimate Fighter: Team Carwin vs. Team Nelson Finale in December 2012.

A light heavyweight bout between former UFC Light Heavyweight Championship challenger Anthony Smith and Jamahal Hill was expected to headline the event. However in mid-December, Hill was pulled from the contest in order to headline UFC 283 against former champion Glover Teixeira for the vacant title. Smith was later scheduled to face Johnny Walker on May 13 at UFC Fight Night 224.

A bantamweight bout between former UFC Bantamweight Champion Petr Yan and Merab Dvalishvili headlined the event.

A bantamweight bout between Mario Bautista and Guido Cannetti took place at the event. They were previously scheduled to meet at UFC on ESPN: Barboza vs. Chikadze, but Bautista pulled out after testing positive for COVID-19.

A middleweight bout between Makhmud Muradov and Abusupiyan Magomedov was expected to take place at the event. They were previously scheduled to meet at UFC Fight Night: Gane vs. Tuivasa but Muradov withdrew due to injury. At the end of February, it was announced that Muradov had pulled out of the bout again.

A bantamweight bout between Raphael Assunção and Kyler Phillips was scheduled for the event.  However, Phillips withdrew from the event for undisclosed reasons and was replaced by Davey Grant.

A light heavyweight bout between Nikita Krylov and former LFA Light Heavyweight Champion Ryan Spann was originally expected to headline UFC Fight Night: Muniz vs. Allen. However, the headliner was canceled during the broadcast as Krylov had fallen ill. The pair was rescheduled for this event at a catchweight of 215 pounds.

A welterweight bout between Carlston Harris and Abubakar Nurmagomedov was expected to take place at the event. However, Nurmagomedov withdrew from the bout due to undisclosed reasons and was replaced by Jared Gooden. At the weigh-ins, Gooden weighed in at 177 pounds, six pounds over the welterweight non-title fight limit. The bout proceeded at catchweight and Gooden was fined 30% of his purse, which went to Harris. 

Also at the weigh-ins, Ricardo Ramos weighed in at 154 pounds, eight pounds over the featherweight non-title fight limit. As a result, his bout with Austin Lingo was canceled.

Results

Bonus awards
The following fighters received $50,000 bonuses.
Fight of the Night: Vitor Petrino vs. Anton Turkalj
Performance of the Night: Davey Grant and Bruno Gustavo da Silva

See also 

 List of UFC events
 List of current UFC fighters
 2023 in UFC

References 

 

UFC Fight Night
2023 in mixed martial arts
2023 in sports in Nevada
March 2023 sports events in the United States